Zirab (also Romanized as Zīrāb and Zīr Āb) is a village in Zirab Rural District, in the Central District of Zarrin Dasht County, Fars Province, Iran. At the 2006 census, its population was 3,018, in 634 families.

References 

Populated places in Zarrin Dasht County